Utricularia pusilla, the tiny bladderwort, is an annual, terrestrial carnivorous plant that belongs to the genus Utricularia (family Lentibulariaceae). Its distribution includes ranges in Mexico, the Caribbean and Central and South America: specifically in Argentina, Belize, Bolivia, Brazil, Colombia, Costa Rica, Cuba, Dominica, the Dominican Republic, Ecuador, French Guiana, Guatemala, Guyana, Honduras, Jamaica, Nicaragua, Panama, Paraguay, Peru, Puerto Rico, Surinam, Trinidad and Tobago, and Venezuela.

See also 
 List of Utricularia species

References 

pusilla
Carnivorous plants of Central America
Carnivorous plants of North America
Carnivorous plants of South America
Flora of Mexico
Flora of South America
Taxa named by Martin Vahl
Plants described in 1804